Húxiān ( "Fox Immortal"), also called Húshén ( "Fox God") or Húwáng ( "Fox Ruler") is a deity in Chinese religion whose cult is present in provinces of north China (from Henan and Shandong upwards), but especially in northeast China where it can be said to be the most popular deity.

The deity can be represented as either male or female, but is most frequently identified as the female Húxiān Niángniáng ( "Fox Immortal Lady") whose animal form is a nine-tailed fox. She is the Chinese equivalent of the Japanese Shintō cult of Inari Ōkami, both god(desses) of the foxes or collective representations of the fox spirits.

Mythology tells that fox spirits are masters of the arts of metamorphosis, and can manifest in human form to seduce men or women. In exchange, they convey wealth and property. In mystical literature, influenced by Taoism, fox spirits are immortal or transcendent beings of a high level in the spiritual hierarchy or beings who engage in the pursuit of becoming immortals.

The fox deity is also represented as a couple of gods, male and female, called the Great Lord of the Three Foxes ( Húsān Tàiyé) and the Great Lady of the Three Foxes ( Húsān Tàinǎi). As a goddess, the Fox Immortal is related to Xīwángmǔ ( "Queen Mother of the West"), the great goddess guardian of Mount Kunlun (axis mundi).

Prevalence of the sect in northeast China
Nagao Ryuzō, a Japanese sinologist, observed that the Fox Gods "enjoy such popularity to be worshipped by almost every household in north China and Manchuria". Henry Doré documented the worship of the Fox God in the northern parts of Jiangsu and Anhui. In parts of Hebei, to every newborn is assigned his own běnshén ( patron god) manifestation of Huxian, usually a female for a boy and a male for a girl. After these boys and girls get married, their patrons will be represented sitting together. In his survey of popular shrines and temples in Manchuria, Takizawa Shunryō found the number dedicated to Fox Gods overwhelming.

See also
 Fox spirit
 Huli jing
 Kitsune
 Inari Ōkami

Other
 Chinese folk religion
 Chinese gods and immortals
 Northeast China folk religion
 Shen (Chinese religion)

Citations

References

Sources
 

Chinese deities
Fox deities